Barbora Poláková (born 3 October 1983 in Kolín) is a Czech actress and singer.

Selected filmography

Films 
 Kráska v nesnázích (2006)
 Láska z kontejneru (2011) 
 Láska je láska (2012) 
 Život je život (2015)
 Instalatér z Tuchlovic (2016)

TV series 
 Okresní přebor (2010)
 Dokonalý svět (2010)
 Základka (2012)
 Neviditelní (2014)
 Marta a Věra (2014)

Discography

Studio albums
Barbora Poláková (2015) 
ZE.MĚ (2018)

Singles
2015: Nafrněná
2017: Po válce
2019: Poď Si (feat. Eva Samková) 
2020: Polovina
2020: Filtr Tour (feat. Marek Adamczyk, Patrik Děrgel, Peter Pecha, David Hlaváč, Marta Kloučková)

References

External links

Biography on csfd.cz

YouTube channel

1983 births
Living people
Czech film actresses
21st-century Czech actresses
Czech stage actresses
Czech television actresses
People from Kolín
Academy of Performing Arts in Prague alumni
21st-century Czech women singers